Nitryl is the nitrogen dioxide (NO2) moiety when it occurs in a larger compound as a univalent fragment. Examples include nitryl fluoride (NO2F) and nitryl chloride (NO2Cl).

Like nitrogen dioxide, the nitryl moiety contains a nitrogen atom with two bonds to the two oxygen atoms, and a third bond shared equally between the nitrogen and the two oxygen atoms. The nitrogen-centred radical is then free to form a bond with another univalent fragment (X) to produce an N−X bond, where X can be F, Cl, OH, etc.

In organic nomenclature, the nitryl moiety is known as the nitro group.  For instance, nitryl benzene is normally called nitrobenzene (PhNO2).

See also
 Dinitrogen tetroxide
 Nitro compound
 Nitrosyl (R−N=O)
 Isocyanide (R−N≡C)
 Nitryl fluoride
 Nitrate

References

Inorganic nitrogen compounds
Oxides
Free radicals
Nitrogen–oxygen compounds